Jean-François Picheral (born 26 February 1934, in Nîmes) is a French Socialist politician. He served as a member of Mayor of Aix-en-Provence from 1989 to 2001, and as a French Senator from 1998 to 2008.

Biography
He was born on February 26, 1934. He was a distant cousin of Gaston Defferre (1910-1986), who served as a Socialist French Senator from 1959 to 1962, and as Mayor of Marseille from 1953 to 1986.

He worked as a radiologist.

A Socialist, he served as Mayor of Aix-en-Provence from 1989 to 2001, and as French Senator from 1998 to 2008.

References

1934 births
Living people
People from Nîmes
Socialist Party (France) politicians
French Senators of the Fifth Republic
Mayors of Aix-en-Provence
French radiologists
Senators of Bouches-du-Rhône